The 2009 Verizon Wireless 250 was the third round of the 2009 Rolex Sports Car Series season. It took place at New Jersey Motorsports Park on May 3, 2009.

Race results
Class Winners in bold.

Verizon Wireless 250
Verizon Wireless